Gevurah or Geburah (Tiberian: Găḇūrā, lit. 'strength'), is the fifth sephirah in the kabbalistic tree of life, and it is the second of the emotive attributes of the sephirot. It sits below Binah, across from Chesed and above Hod.

Gevurah is "the essence of judgment (DIN) and limitation", and corresponds to awe and the element of fire. 

In the Bahir it is written "And who are the Officers? We learned that there are three. Strength (Gevurah) is the Officer of all the Holy Forms to the left of the Blessed Holy One. He is Gabriel."

According to some modern sources, Gevurah is associated with the color red.

Description
Gevurah is the fifth of the ten Sefirot and second of the emotive attributes in Creation, and which corresponds to the second day of creation (Zohar 2:127b). In the Bahir it says "What is the fifth (utterance)? Fifth is the great fire of God, of which it says 'let me see no more of this great fire, lest I die' (Deut 18:16). This is the left hand of God".

Gevurah is understood as God's mode of punishing the wicked and judging humanity in general. It is the foundation of stringency, absolute adherence to the letter of the law, and strict meting out of justice. This stands in contrast to Chesed.

We thus speak of God's primary modes of action as being the kindness and unaccountability of Chesed, versus the stringency and strict accountability of Gevurah. It is called "might" because of the power of God's absolute judgment.

Gevurah is associated in the soul with the power to restrain one's innate urge to bestow goodness upon others, when the recipient of that good is judged to be unworthy and liable to misuse it. As the force which measures and assesses the worthiness of Creation, Gevurah is also referred to in Kabbalah as "Midat Hadin" ("the attribute of judgment"). It is the restraining might of Gevurah which allows one to overcome his enemies, be they from without or from within (his evil inclination).

The angelic order of this sphere is the Seraphim, ruled by the Archangel Kamael. The opposing Qliphah is represented by the demonic order Golachab, ruled by the Archdemon Asmodeus.

Chesed and Gevurah act together to create an inner balance in the soul's approach to the outside world. While the "right arm" of Chesed operates to draw others near, the "left arm" of Gevurah reserves the option of repelling those deemed undeserving. (Even towards those to whom one's initial relation is that of "the left arm repels", one must subsequently apply the complementary principle of "the right arm draws near".)

Ultimately, the might of Gevurah becomes the power and forcefulness to implement one's innate desire of Chesed. Only by the power of Gevurah is Chesed able to penetrate the coarse, opposing surface of reality.  The Baal Shem Tov discusses the ability of Gevurah to effect Divine withdrawal (Tzimtzum), which in turn creates the potential for Chesed to occur in creation (commentary to Parshat Toldot).

Gevurah appears in the configuration of the Sefirot along the left axis, directly beneath Binah, and corresponds in the tzelem Elokim to the "left arm".

The numerical value of Gevurah, 216, is 6 times 6 times 6. The tablets of the covenant that Moses received at Sinai were 6 by 6 by 3 handbreadths. The Torah was given to Moses and Israel from "the Mouth of the Gevurah". It is most significant that the name of no other Sefirah is used by our sages to connote God Himself, other than Gevurah (in the Bible, God is referred to as "the Netzach [eternity] of Israel" (Samuel 1 15:29), but not as Netzach alone). Here, Gevurah implies God's essential power to contract and concentrate His infinite light and strength into the finite letters of Torah (especially those engraved on the tablets of the covenant, the Ten Commandments).

Gevurah = 216 = 3 times 72 (chesed). Each of God's 72 hidden names possesses three letters, in all 216 letters. Meaning inheres to words and names. The ultimate "meaning" of every one of God's Names is His expression of love (Chesed) for His Creation. Each Name expresses His love in a unique way. The components of each word and name, the "building blocks" of Creation are the letters which combine to form the words. The letters, "hewn" from the "raw material" of "pro-creation" (the secret of the reshimu, the "impression" of God's infinite light which remains after the initial act of tzimtzum, "contraction") reflect God's Gevurah.

The two hands which act together to form all reality, Chesed (72) plus Gevurah (216) = 288 = 2 times 12 squared. The number of 'Nitzotzot' is 288 "fallen sparks" (from the primordial cataclysm of "the breaking of the vessels"), which permeate all of created reality. Through the "dual effort" of Chesed and Gevurah, not only to form reality, but to rectify reality (through the means of "the left arm repels while the right draws near"), these fallen sparks are redeemed and elevated to return and unite with their ultimate source. In a universal sense, this is the secret of the coming of Mashiach and the resurrection of the dead.

Notes

References

 Bahir, translated by Aryeh Kaplan (1995). Aronson.
  via

External links
 Basics in Kabbalah, The Ten Sefirot: Gevurah  (inner.org)

Sephirot
Kabbalistic words and phrases